Lindsay Casinelli (born September 3, 1985) is a Venezuelan journalist. Casinelli is currently the host of the weekly sports show República Deportiva and co-host of Contacto Deportivo weeknights on Univision.

Early years
Casinelli was born in Venezuela in 1985. During an interview, Casinelli revealed she was 16 years old when graduated high school in Venezuela. In the year of 2001, Casinelli moved to the United States where she attended California State University, where she graduated with her bachelor's degree in Broadcast Journalism.

Career
Casinelli began her career as the host of MLB's Los Angeles Angels weekly television show "Angels in Action." In 2008, Casinelli was the host for the NBA's Los Angeles Lakers weekly magazine show " El Show de Los Lakers" in which she became the first female sports anchor for the local Univision channel KMEX. In 2009, she was hired as a news reporter in New York City. In 2010, Casinelli was hired by ESPN in which she worked as a sideline reporter then later was the host of the show “Viernes de Combates.” Casinelli also is an Emmy award winner for her journalism. She is also on Univision as a sportscaster. In August 2014, Casinelli helped to raise awareness of the disease ALS by participating in the Ice Bucket Challenge.

References

External links
 

Living people
Venezuelan women journalists
1985 births
Univision people